Sponvika is a village in Halden municipality, Norway. Its population in 2006 was 413.

References

Villages in Østfold